Gholam-Abbas Ashoubi (born 6 April 1980), better known as Farzad Ashoubi, is an Iranian former footballer who last played for Rah Ahan in the Persian Gulf Pro League.

Club career 
In August 2006, he moved from Azadegan League club Oghab to the Iranian giants, Persepolis. He scored a spectacular goal from Persepolis' half against Saba Battery. By the end of 2007/2008 season he joined to Mes Kerman. He helped the club to promote for AFC Champions League but at the end of the season there was rumours that he might move back to Persepolis and there was reports that his agent signed for him with Persepolis F.C. while he was in Team Melli camp in June 2009 but somedays later he extended his contract with Mes Kerman. Where he stayed for two seasons before joining Esteghlal and Tractor Sazi for a season each and finish the season as runner up. He joined Rah Ahan while Ali Daei was the head coach of them in 2012.

Club career statistics
Last Update: 13 May 2022

Assists

International career 
Ashoubi was called up to the Iran national team in June 2007 for the West Asian Football Federation Championship 2007. He made his debut for Iran in Iran's first match vs Iraq. He was called back for Team Melli under Afshin Ghotbi.

Honours

Club
Persepolis
Iran Pro League: 2007–08
Hazfi Cup
Runner-up: 2006 Hazfi Cup Final

Esteghlal
Iran Pro League
Runner-up: 2010–11

Tractor
Iran Pro League
Runner-up: 2011–12

International
WAFF: 2007

Individual
Football Iran News & Events
Young player of the year (2006–07)

References

External links
 

1980 births
Association football midfielders
Iran international footballers
Iranian footballers
Living people
Esteghlal F.C. players
Persepolis F.C. players
Sanat Mes Kerman F.C. players
Rah Ahan players
FC DAC 1904 Dunajská Streda players
Slovak Super Liga players
Expatriate footballers in Slovakia
Iranian expatriate sportspeople in Slovakia
People from Ray, Iran